The purpose of Pspell (Portable Spell Checker Interface Library) was to provide a generic interface to the system spelling checking libraries.  It was, and sometimes still is, used in computer programming such as C, and is licensed under the GNU Lesser General Public License.

Pspell has not been updated since 2001, but is still available on SourceForge at its project page.  It has been replaced by GNU Aspell. PHP’s Pspell extension, while retaining its current name, now uses the Aspell library.

See also

 GNU Aspell
 Hunspell
 Ispell
 MySpell
Virastyar

External links
SourceForge.net Project Info
GNU Aspell SourceForge.net Project Info

Free spelling checking programs
Language software for Linux